Lála is a surname. Notable people with the surname include:

Jan Lála (born 1938), Czech former footballer
Jiří Lála (born 1959), Czech retired ice hockey player

See also
26973 Lála, a main-belt asteroid